Scott Targett is a businessman in the province of New Brunswick, Canada.  He is also a former politician having served in the Legislative Assembly of New Brunswick from 2003 to 2006.

A Liberal, he served in the shadow cabinet of Shawn Graham critiquing the ministers of natural resources and later human resources.  He was also chair of the Liberal caucus from 2003 to 2004.

Born in rural New Brunswick, Targett was educated at the University of New Brunswick. He married Rhonda MacDonald.

References 

Living people
New Brunswick Liberal Association MLAs
University of New Brunswick alumni
Year of birth missing (living people)
21st-century Canadian politicians